Arran (Middle Persian form; Persian: ارّان), also known as Aran, was a geographical name used in ancient and medieval times to signify a historically-Iranian region which lay within the triangle of land, lowland in the east and mountainous in the west, formed by the junction of the Kura and Aras rivers, including the highland and lowland Karabakh, Mil plain and parts of the Mughan plain. In pre-Islamic times, it corresponded roughly to the territory of the modern-day Republic of Azerbaijan. The term is the Middle Persian equivalent to the Greco-Roman Albania. It was known as Aghvania, Alvan-k in Armenian, and Al-ran (Arabized form of Arran) in Arabic.

Today, the term Aran is mainly used in Azerbaijan to indicate territories consisting of Mil and Mughan plains (mostly, Beylagan, Imishli, Kurdamir, Saatly, Sabirabad provinces of the Republic of Azerbaijan). It has also been used by Iranian historian Enayatollah Reza to refer to the country of Azerbaijan, freeing the name "Azerbaijan" to refer to a region within Iran. The bulk of the territory of the republic of Azerbaijan was the historic Shirvan, as well as Kuba/Qubbah).

Etymology

The region is known as Ardhan in Parthian, Al-Ran in Arabic, Aghvank or Alvank in Armenian, Rani in Georgian and Caucasian Albania in Latin.

According to the Movses Kagankatvatsi, Arran or Arhan was the name of the legendary founder of Caucasian Albania, who in some versions was the son of Noah's son Yafet (Japheth) and also, possibly the eponym of the ancient Caucasian Albanians (Aghvan), and/or the Iranian tribe known as Alans (Alani). The nearby Araks (Aras) river was known to Ancient Greek geographers as the Araxes, and has a source near Mount Ararat. James Darmesteter, in his discussion of the geography of the Avesta's Vendidad I, observes that the 12th century Bundahishn (29:12) identified the "Airyana Vaego by the Vanguhi Daitya" on the northern border of Azerbaijan, and did so "probably in order that it should be as near as possible to the seat of the Zoroastrian religion yet without losing its supernatural character by the counter-evidence of facts." Darmesteter further associated the Vanguhi Daitya river with the Araxes, and compared the name "Airyana Vaego" with that of Arran.

According to C.E. Bosworth:

{{cquote|The Georgians knew them [the Caucasian Albanians] as Rani, a form taken over in an Arabized form for the early Islamic geographical term al-Rān (pronounced ar-Rān).}}
Later Greek writers also call the country Ariania instead of Albania, and the people Arianoi instead of Albanoi. In some Classical authors one finds the form Arian/Aryan.

Boundaries

In pre-Islamic times, Caucasian Albania/Arran was a wider concept than that of post-Islamic Arran. Ancient Arran covered all of eastern  Transcaucasia, which included most of the territory of the modern-day Azerbaijan Republic and part of the territory of Dagestan. However, in post-Islamic times the geographic notion of Arran shrank to the territory between the rivers of Kura and Araks.

A medieval chronicle, the "Ajayib-ad-Dunya", written in the 13th century by an unknown author, says Arran was 30 parasangs (200 km) in width, and 40 farsakhs (270 km) in length. The entire right bank of the Kura river until it joined with the Aras was attributed to Arran (the left bank of the Kura was known as Shirvan). The boundaries of Arran have shifted throughout history, sometimes encompassing the entire territory of the present-day Republic of Azerbaijan, and at other times only parts of the South Caucasus. Sometimes Arran was part of Armenia.

Medieval Islamic geographers gave descriptions of Arran in general, and of its towns, including Barda, Beylagan, and Ganja.

History of ArranHistory of Arran is summarized in History of Azerbaijan section, where you can refer for detailed description.Pre-Islamic

Islamic
Following the Arab invasion of Iran, the Arabs invaded the Caucasus in the 8th century and most of the former territory of Caucasian Albania was included under the name of Arran. This region was at times part of the Abbasid Caliphate based on numismatic and historical evidence. Dynasties of Parthian or Persian descent, such as the Mihranids had come to rule the territory during Sassanian times. Its kings were given the title Arranshah'', and after the Arab invasions, fought against the caliphate from the late 7th to middle 8th centuries.

Early Muslim ruling dynasties of the time included Rawadids, Sajids, Salarids, Shaddadids, Shirvanshahs, and the Sheki and Tiflis emirates. The principal cities of Arran in early medieval times were Bardha'a (Partav) and Ganja. Bardha'a reached prominence in the 10th century and was used to house a mint. Bardha'a was sacked by the Rus and Norse several times in the 10th century as a result of the Caspian expeditions of the Rus. Bardha'a never recovered after these raids and was replaced as capital by Beylaqan, which in turn was sacked by the Mongols in 1221. After this Ganja rose to prominence and became the central city of the region. The capital of the Shaddadid dynasty, Ganja was considered the "mother city of Arran" during their reign.

The territory of Arran became a part of the Seljuq Empire, followed by the Ildegizid state. It was taken briefly by the Khwarizmid dynasty and then overran by Mongol Hulagu empire in the 13th century. Later, it became a part of Chobanid, Jalayirid, Timurid, and Iranian Safavid, Afsharid, and Qajar states which means at least from 1500 until 1828, when Iran lost a major battle to the expanding Russian Empire and as a result had to sign the Treaty of Turkmenchay in which it had to concede all the Caucasus territories to Russia.

People

The population of Arran consisted of a great variety of peoples. Greek, Roman and Armenian authors provide the names of some peoples who inhabited the lands between the Kur and Araxes rivers:

 Utians and Mycians — apparently migrants from the south,
 Caspians, Gargarians and Gardmans 
 Sakasenians — of Scythian origin,
 Gelians, Sodians, Lupenians, Balasanians — possibly Caucasian tribes,
 Parsians and Parrasians — were probably Iranian

In the late 4th century, when the region passed to Caucasian Albania, its population consisted of Armenians and Armenicized aborigines, though many of the latter were still cited as distinct ethnic entities.

In pre-Islamic times the population of Arran and most of Caucasian Albania had mostly been Christian who belonged to the Church of Caucasian Albania. Under Arabic rule (7th to 9th centuries) a part of the population was Islamicized and adopted Alevism. Muslim chronicles of the 10th century reported that some of the population of Arran spoke al-rānīya, as well as Arabic and Persian languages. Because there is no written evidence, some scholars have presumed al-rānīya to be an Iranian dialect while others have presumed it to be a remnant of a Caucasian Albanian language. The area in which there was Ganja, during the 9th to 12th century named Arran; its urban population spoke mainly in Persian.

After the Turkification of the region, the population became Turkic speaking, and thus referred to by Europeans, particularly the Russians, as Tartars. They were much later called Azerbaijanis.

With the exception of some Uti, the population of Arran which remained Christian, was ultimately absorbed by the Armenians and in part by the Georgians.

See also
Caucasian Albania
Aghuank
South Caucasus
Transcaucasia
Azerbaijan Democratic Republic
Azerbaijan SSR
Iranian Azerbaijan

Sources
 Bashi, Munnjim, Duwal Al-Islam
 Minorsky, V., Studies in Caucasian History, Cambridge University Press, 1957
 Volkmar Gantzhorn, Oriental Carpets

References

Historical regions in Azerbaijan
Former regions of Armenia
Historical regions of Iran
Medieval Azerbaijan